Barcin  is a town in Poland, in Kuyavian-Pomeranian Voivodeship, in Żnin County. As of December 2021, the town has a population of 7,255.

History

Barcin was founded in the 12th century, when it was part of Piast-ruled Poland. In 1472 it was granted privileges, which established local fairs. In the following centuries, it was a private town, administratively located in the Kcynia County in the Kalisz Voivodeship in the Greater Poland Province of the Polish Crown.

Following the joint German-Soviet invasion of Poland, which started World War II in September 1939, the town was invaded and then occupied by Germany. Barcin was one of the sites of executions of Poles carried out by Germany in 1939 as part of the Intelligenzaktion. Three Poles who were either born or lived in Barcin were also murdered by the Russians in the large Katyn massacre in April–May 1940. In 1943, the Germans renamed the town Bartelstädt to erase traces of Polish origin, however the historic name was restored after the German occupation ended in 1945.

References

External links

 Official website 
 Jewish community of Barcin on Virtual Shtetl

Cities and towns in Kuyavian-Pomeranian Voivodeship
Żnin County
12th-century establishments in Poland
Populated places established in the 12th century